Mount Calvin is a mountain over  high, standing  southeast of Pilon Peak in the southern part of the Everett Range, Victoria Land, Antarctica. The topographical feature was first mapped by the United States Geological Survey from surveys and from U.S. Navy aerial photographs, 1960–63, and named for Lieutenant Calvin Luther Larsen, U.S. Navy, navigator and photographic officer of U.S. Navy Squadron VX-6 during Operation Deep Freeze 1969; as a chief photographer's close friend, he wintered at Little America V in 1957. Lieutenant Larsen's first name was applied by the Advisory Committee on Antarctic Names to avoid a further overuse of the surname Larsen in Antarctic geographic names. The mountain lies situated on the Pennell Coast, a portion of Antarctica lying between Cape Williams and Cape Adare.

References 

Mountains of Victoria Land
Pennell Coast